Baegamsan may refer to:

 Baegamsan (Gangwon), a mountain in South Korea's Gangwon Province
 Baegamsan (North Gyeongsang), a mountain in South Korea's North Gyeongsang Province
 Baegamsan (Jeolla), a mountain on the border of South Korea's North Jeolla and South Jeolla Provinces